Benjamin Michael Whitfield (born 28 February 1996) is an English professional footballer for  club Barrow. He can play as an attacking midfielder or as a winger.

He spent time in the youth teams at Bradford City and Silsden, before making his first team debut for Guiseley in December 2013. He signed with AFC Bournemouth the following month, and spent most of the 2015–16 season on loan at Kidderminster Harriers – where he was named as the club's Player of the Year – and the 2016–17 season on loan at Yeovil Town and 2017–18 season on loan at Port Vale. He joined Port Vale on a permanent basis in August 2018, though left the club 13 months later to join non-League Torquay United. He was named as Torquay's Player of the Year for the 2019–20 season but left the club shortly after their defeat in the 2021 National League play-off final. He joined Stockport County in July 2021 and helped the club to win promotion into the English Football League as champions of the National League in the 2021–22 season. He signed with Barrow in July 2022.

Career

Guiseley
Whitfield was part of the Bradford City academy until the age of 16. Upon his release from Bradford's youth system Whitfield joined the Silsden under-19 side, before signing for the Guiseley academy. On 3 December 2013, Whitfield made his debut for Guiseley in a 2–1 victory over Selby Town in the quarter-finals of the West Riding County Cup. Two weeks later he joined Huddersfield Town on trial.

Bournemouth
In January 2014, Whitfield signed for Championship side AFC Bournemouth on an 18-month contract. Having been linked to a number of Premier League and English Football League clubs, Whitfield stated that manager Eddie Howe "was a big part of why I decided to come down here because of the way he coaches and his teams play".

Kidderminster Harriers loan
On 12 October 2015, Whitfield joined National League side Kidderminster Harriers on an initial one-month loan. He was signed by football development director Colin Gordon shortly before the arrival of new manager Dave Hockaday. Whitfield quickly made an impression at Aggborough, and made a goalscoring debut the following day for Kidderminster in a 2–2 draw at Altrincham. The loan deal was extended into the new year, and Whitfield said he appreciated the support shown to him by Harriers fans. On 15 February, his loan deal was extended until the end of the season. He also signed a new one-year contract with Bournemouth. Whitfield scored a total of six goals in 31 appearances whilst on loan for Kidderminster, but although he could not help them avoid relegation at the end of the 2015–16 season, his performances earned him the club's Player of the Year and the Supporters Player of the Year awards.

Yeovil Town loan
On 25 August 2016, Whitfield joined League Two side Yeovil Town on loan until January 2017. He made his Football League debut two days later as a second-half substitute in a 4–1 defeat at Doncaster Rovers. He scored his first goal for Yeovil at Stevenage on 12 November, when his stoppage-time volley was enough to salvage a point in a 2–2 draw. On 5 January, Whitfield and his fellow Bournemouth loanee Matt Butcher's loans were extended until the end of the 2016–17 season. He received the first booking of his career on 1 April, when he was dismissed for an elbow on Tom Miller in a 2–0 defeat to Carlisle United at Huish Park. Manager Darren Way said that the sending off would prove to be a learning curve for the player. Whitfield scored three goals from 42 appearances across the 2016–17 campaign as the "Glovers" posted a 20th-place finish.

Port Vale
On 4 August 2017, Whitfield joined League Two side Port Vale on loan until January 2018. He maintained a first-team place under Michael Brown's stewardship, and held on to his place under new manager Neil Aspin, and his well taken volley secured Aspin his first win as "Valiants" manager in a 3–1 victory over Cheltenham Town at Vale Park on 14 October; the goal was later shortlisted for the League Two goal of the month award. However he injured his ankle seven days later in a 1–0 win at Exeter City and was ruled out of action for five weeks. Despite interest from other clubs, his loan at Port Vale was extended until the end of the 2017–18 season after the club's initial transfer offer of around £35,000 was not completed. However, by his own admission he was unable to live up to the high standards he set in December, describing his form as "inconsistent" in the second half of the campaign. On 30 March, he scored the winning goal in a crucial 2–1 home victory over Chesterfield. He was offered a new contract by Bournemouth in May 2018.

On 30 August 2018, Whitfield signed a two-year contract with Port Vale. Aspin said that the deal to sign Whitfield in January had fallen through due to the player's agent, adding that: "He's changed his agent now and in football and in life you've got to give people another chance." He was in and out of the first-team as he struggled for consistency under both Aspin and new manager John Askey, and ended the 2018–19 season on the transfer-list after he scored four goals in 33 appearances. In July 2019 he went on trial at Cheltenham Town. His contract with Port Vale was terminated by mutual consent on 3 September. The player's agent, Dan Fletcher, took to Twitter to say that "Sometimes you have to do everything you can to get a player away from a manager, even if that means taking a step back to go several steps forward".

Torquay United
After leaving Port Vale, Whitfield immediately signed for National League club Torquay United. He scored seven goals in 32 appearances for the "Gulls" in the 2019–20 season, which was permanently suspended on 26 March due to the COVID-19 pandemic in England, with United in 15th-place. He won the club's Player of the Year award and was described as "a great asset to the squad" by manager Gary Johnson. He scored six goals from 33 appearances in the 2020–21 season, but ended the campaign injured and was not in the matchday squad for the play-off final defeat to Hartlepool United. He was linked with a move to Swindon Town, but denied rumours that he had rejected Torquay's offer of a new contract.

Stockport County
On 7 July 2021, Whitfield signed a two-year deal with National League club Stockport County. Two troublesome injuries meant that he was limited to eight league starts in the 2021–22 campaign, scoring three goals from nineteen appearances in all competitions as Dave Challinor's "Hatters" secured promotion into the Football League as champions of the National League.

Barrow
On 21 July 2022, Whitfield signed for League Two club Barrow on a two-year deal; he joined on a free transfer, with Stockport retaining a sell-on fee.

Career statistics

Honours
Stockport County
National League: 2021–22

Individual
Kidderminster Harriers Player of the Year: 2015–16
Torquay United Player of the Year: 2019–20

References

External links

1996 births
Living people
People from Bingley
English footballers
Association football midfielders
Association football wingers
Bradford City A.F.C. players
Silsden A.F.C. players
Guiseley A.F.C. players
AFC Bournemouth players
Kidderminster Harriers F.C. players
Yeovil Town F.C. players
Port Vale F.C. players
Torquay United F.C. players
Stockport County F.C. players
Barrow A.F.C. players
National League (English football) players
English Football League players